The Lewiston Indians were a minor league baseball team in the western United States, based in Lewiston, Idaho. They played in the Pioneer League during the 1939 season, at the Class C level, and were not affiliated with any Major League Baseball (MLB) team. The team's home ballpark was Bengal Field.

History
The Indians were one of the six original teams of the Pioneer League when it was formed in 1939. The team was managed by Herb Sanders, who had pitched in the minor leagues for 12 seasons between 1923 and 1937, and helped to found the Pioneer League.  The Indians finished in last place and did not continue past 1939; Lewiston did not have another minor league team until 1952, the Lewiston Broncs.

Season records

All-stars

Notable players
Three members of the team appeared in the major leagues; pitcher Lou Garland (1931 Chicago White Sox), outfielder Don White (Philadelphia Athletics in 1948 and 1949), and pitcher Hal Erickson (1953 Detroit Tigers).

See also
Lewiston Indians players

References

External links
Baseball Reference – Lewiston teams
NWSABR – team photo

Baseball teams established in 1939
Defunct Pioneer League (baseball) teams
Professional baseball teams in Idaho
Sports clubs disestablished in 1939
1939 establishments in Idaho
1939 disestablishments in Idaho
Defunct baseball teams in Idaho
Baseball teams disestablished in 1939